The Destinations served by Albawings as of February 2021.

References

Lists of airline destinations